The following is a list of notable events and releases of the year 1899 in Norwegian music.

Events

Deaths

Births

 June
 9 – Signe Amundsen, classical violinist and orchestral leader (died 1987).

 September
 23 – Odd Grüner-Hegge, orchestra conductor (died 1973).

 October
 30 – Einar Fagstad, accordionist, singer, actor and composer (died 1961).

 November
 29 – Arvid Kleven, composer and flautist (died 1929).

See also
 1899 in Norway
 Music of Norway

References

 
Norwegian music
Norwegian
Music
1890s in Norwegian music